The 1st Annual Gotham Independent Film Awards, presented by the Independent Filmmaker Project, were held on September 30, 1991. At the ceremony hosted by Charles Grodin, Irwin Young was honored with a Career Tribute with Jonathan Demme, John Turturro, Richard Price, Ernest Dickerson and Michael Hausman receiving the other individual awards.

Winners

Breakthrough Director (Open Palm Award)
 Jennie Livingston – Paris Is Burning

Filmmaker Award
 Jonathan Demme

Actor Award
 John Turturro

Writer Award
 Richard Price

Below-the-Line Award
 Ernest Dickerson, cinematographer

Producer/Industry Executive Award
 Michael Hausman

Career Tribute
 Irwin Young

References

External links
 

1991
1991 film awards